Enoch is a city in Iron County, Utah, United States, and is located approximately  northeast of Cedar City in the northeast part of Cedar Valley. The population was 5,803 at the 2010 census, up from 3,467 at the 2000 census. As of 2018 the estimated population was 7,039.

History
Enoch was founded by Joel H. Johnson. It was originally known as Johnson's Springs and Fort Johnson.

Enoch was originally settled as part of an iron mission along with Cedar City and Parowan. The area was originally known as "Fort Johnson" and "Johnson Springs", after Joel H. Johnson, the earliest known white settler, who came to the area in 1851 with his family. In 1890, the area's name was changed to "Enoch", to avoid confusion with another settlement in Utah also named Johnson Springs. Enoch was officially incorporated on January 10, 1966, absorbing nearby Grimshawville, Stevensville, and Williamsville. The present name is after the Order of Enoch.

Enoch was incorporated on 10 January 1966 and at that time absorbed the neighboring communities of Grimshawville, Stevensville and Williamsville.

In June 2011, a new stake of the Church of Jesus Christ of Latter-day Saints was created. There are now the Enoch and Enoch West stakes. The dividing line is Minersville Highway.

In August 2021, the city sustained heavy flooding. The mayor of Enoch declared a state of emergency and the Red Cross set up a shelter to help citizens who were displaced by flooding in their homes. Iron County's emergency management coordinator reported that about 200 homes were damaged.

On January 4, 2023, a man shot and killed his wife, five children and mother-in-law before killing himself. His wife had recently filed for divorce.

Geography
Enoch is bordered to the south by Cedar City. Interstate 15 forms the southeastern border of Enoch, with access from Exit 62 to the south and Exit 71 to the northeast. I-15 leads north  to Salt Lake City and southwest  to Las Vegas.

Climate
The climate in this area has mild differences between highs and lows, and there is adequate rainfall year-round. According to the Köppen climate classification system, Enoch has a marine west coast climate, abbreviated "Cfb" on climate maps.

In 2021 Enoch experienced heavy flooding after a storm.

Demographics

As of the census of 2000, there were 3,467 people, 958 households, and 858 families residing in the city. The population density was 1,047.1 people per square mile (404.4/km2). There were 1,029 housing units at an average density of 310.8 per square mile (120.0/km2). The racial makeup of the city was 94.78% White, 0.17% African American, 2.45% Native American, 0.26% Asian, 0.40% Pacific Islander, 1.07% from other races, and 0.87% from two or more races. Hispanic or Latino of any race were 2.54% of the population.

There were 958 households, out of which 59.0% had children under 18 living with them, 79.6% were married couples living together, 7.8% had a female householder with no husband present, and 10.4% were non-families. 8.8% of all households were made up of individuals, and 2.1% had someone living alone who was 65 years of age or older. The average household size was 3.62, and the average family size was 3.86.

In the city, the population was spread out, with 41.2% under 18, 11.3% from 18 to 24, 28.2% from 25 to 44, 15.4% from 45 to 64, and 3.9% who were 65 years of age or older. The median age was 24 years. For every 100 females, there were 97.2 males. For every 100 females aged 18 and over, there were 95.4 males.

The median income for a household in the city was $37,368, and the median income for a family was $38,085. Males had a median income of $30,215 versus $19,688 for females. The per capita income was $11,424. About 7.2% of families and 8.9% of the population were below the poverty line, including 12.1% of those under age 18 and 10.0% of those aged 65 or over.

Government
The current city council consists of Mayor Geoffrey Chesnut, with council members David Harris, Richard Jensen, Dave Owens, Katherine Ross, and Shawn Stoor.

The city is organized under a six-member council system of government where the mayor is a non-voting (except in the case of a tie) member. The mayor is charged with the executive duties of the city. Currently, the city has employed a City Manager (Robert Dotson) to handle the day-to-day administration of the city.

Notable people
 Texas Rose Bascom (1922-1993), rodeo trick rider and fancy trick roper, Hollywood actress, hall of fame inductee 
 Joel Hills Johnson (1802-1882), inventor, religious leader, Mormon pioneer, published poet and gospel hymn composer, Utah politician, and judge, founded the town of Enoch

See also

 List of cities and towns in Utah

References

External links

 
 Enoch history

1851 establishments in Utah Territory
Cities in Iron County, Utah
Cities in Utah
Populated places established in 1851